KazSat-1 (QazSat-1) is the first Kazakh communications satellite. It was launched on 17 June 2006, at 22:44:05 UTC by Proton-K / Blok DM-2M launch vehicle.] This satellite was constructed by Khrunichev State Research and Production Space Center for the satellite bus and Thales Alenia Space (Italy) for the payload. Thales Alenia Space is also the provider of KazSat-2 and KazSat-3 payloads.

Satellite description 
The contract for the manufacture and launch of the first Kazakhstani geostationary spacecraft was signed in January 2004. It was produced by Khrunichev State Research and Production Space Center in cooperation with Thales Alenia Space (Italy). The cost of Kazakhstan for the production of the first satellite amounted to US$65 million.

Mission 
Partial control of the satellite was lost in July 2008 and completely in October 2008. It was supposed to serve for 10 years, but already on 26 November 2008, due to a failure in the on-board digital system, it stopped responding to control signals. The failure was declared irreversible, and in August 2009, the satellite was transferred to a burial orbit.

Specifications 
 Zone of service over Kazakhstan territory: Elliptic form  by 
 Frequencies:
 Transmit: 10950 — 11700 MHz
 Receive: 14000 — 14500 MHz
 Beacon: 11199.5 MHz
 Power:
 Television: Minimum 52.5 dBW
 Coherent: Minimum 49.0 dBW
 Reception quality: At least 5.3 db/to
 Transmitter capacity:
 Television (saturation mode) > 65 watts
 Communications and data transmission (saturation mode) > 45 watts
 Communications and data transmission (quasilinear mode) > 28 watts

See also 

 KazSat-2
 KazSat-3

References

External links 
 Frequency Chart of KazSat 1
 KazSat 1
  Первый казахстанский спутник выведен на заданную орбиту

Communications satellites in geostationary orbit
Satellites using the Yakhta bus
Satellites of Kazakhstan
Communications in Kazakhstan
First artificial satellites of a country
Spacecraft launched in 2006
2006 in Kazakhstan